Olav Dufseth (December 19, 1917 – September 22, 2009) was a Norwegian nordic combined and cross-country skier who competed in the 1940s.

Dufseth finished eighth in the Nordic combined event at the 1948 Winter Olympics at St. Moritz. In the 18 kilometre cross-country skiing event he finished 18th.

He was born in Vang, Hedmark and represented the club Vang SF. He died in September 2009 in Rena.

Cross-country skiing results

Olympic Games

References
Olaf Dufseth's profile at Sports Reference.com
15 km individual results 1924-2002 
Olaf Dufseth - veteran i "Birken" 
Fallhøyden er stor når du heter Dufseth 
Olaf Dufseth's obituary 

1917 births
2009 deaths
Sportspeople from Hamar
People from Åmot
Cross-country skiers at the 1948 Winter Olympics
Nordic combined skiers at the 1948 Winter Olympics
Norwegian male cross-country skiers
Norwegian male Nordic combined skiers
Olympic cross-country skiers of Norway
Olympic Nordic combined skiers of Norway